Livingston may refer to the following places in the U.S. state of Michigan:

 Livingston County, Michigan
 Livingston Township, Michigan, in Otsego County
 An unincorporated community in Lake Charter Township, Michigan, Berrien County